The Capt. Sylvester Baxter House is a historic house in Barnstable, Massachusetts.  The -story wood frame Italianate house was built c. 1855 by Captain Sylvester Baxter, a politically prominent local ship's captain.  The house exterior has been stuccoed, and the roof is a cross-gable style with a square cupola on top.  The eaves of the roof and cupola are studded with decorative brackets.  The windows are topped by stilted segmented arches.  The front entrance is sheltered by a hip-roofed porch supported by clusters of round columns.

The house was listed on the National Register of Historic Places in 1987.

See also
National Register of Historic Places listings in Barnstable County, Massachusetts

References

Houses in Barnstable, Massachusetts
National Register of Historic Places in Barnstable County, Massachusetts
Houses on the National Register of Historic Places in Barnstable County, Massachusetts